Shores of Silence: Whale Sharks in India is a landmark film by Mike Pandey that brought about major legislative changes to protect whale sharks worldwide. This documentary depicts the needless killing and harvesting of whale sharks by poor Indian communities. In response to the film, the Indian government introduced legislature to ban fishing of whale sharks, declaring them endangered species and protecting them under the Wildlife Protection Act of 1972. This gives whale sharks equal status to other endangered species such as tigers and rhinoceroses. Internationally, the film helped to bring the whale shark global protection under CITES. The film won 11 international awards including The Wildscreen Panda, also known as the Green Oscar. Recently, the film received four stars from the Hindustan Times.

References

External links
Official site for Mike Pandey
Riverbanks Studios
 
 Full film

2000 films
Indian documentary films
Documentary films about environmental issues
Films about sharks
Documentary films about animal rights
Films about whales
Films about whaling